Sahan Wijeratne (born 27 August 1984) is a Sri Lankan cricketer. He has played more than 100 first-class matches since making his debut in the 2001/02 season.

References

External links
 

1984 births
Living people
Sri Lankan cricketers
Badureliya Sports Club cricketers
Chilaw Marians Cricket Club cricketers
Moors Sports Club cricketers
Nondescripts Cricket Club cricketers
Cricketers from Colombo
Alumni of Prince of Wales' College, Moratuwa